Curaçao national football team 2011
 Curaçao national football team 2012
 Curaçao national football team 2013
 Curaçao national football team 2014
 Curaçao national football team 2015
 Curaçao national football team 2016
 Curaçao national football team 2017